Siavashabad (also Romanized as Sīāvashābād, Sīāvoshābād, and Seyāvashābād; also known as Sīāvosh) is a village in Pachehlak-e Gharbi Rural District, in the Central District of Azna County, Lorestan Province, Iran. At the 2006 census, its population was 477, in 92 families.

References 

Towns and villages in Azna County